Domna is a Russian Air Force base in Chita, Zabaykalsky Krai, Russia located 27 km southwest of Chita.  It is a large, hardened facility with six areas of revetments probably holding 50 fighter aircraft.  MiG-23 aircraft from Domna were deployed to Shindand, Afghanistan in the late 1980s.

The base is home to the 120th Composite Aviation Regiment, flying Mikoyan MiG-29s and Sukhoi Su-25s.

Based units

Units stationed at Domna include:
 733rd Bomber Aviation Regiment (733 BAP) flying Sukhoi Su-24 aircraft from 1975 to 1987. The regiment arrived at Domna in July 1966. Su-24M aircraft arrived in 1984. The regiment was disbanded in July 1987.
 120th Fighter Aviation Regiment (120 IAP) The regiment was established in 1969 at Bereza-Osovitsy, Brest Oblast. In July 1971, possibly as part of the buildup against the People's Republic of China, it was moved to Domna. In 1978 it converted to the Mikoyan-Gurevich MiG-23, and in 1993 to the Mikoyan MiG-29. It was part of the 23rd Air Army from 1988 to 1998, the 14th Air and Air Defence Forces Army from 1998 to circa 2009, the 3rd AF & AD Command 2009–2015, and now the 11th Air and Air Defence Forces Army.
 125 Gv ORAP (125th Guards Independent Reconnaissance Aviation Regiment) flying Su-17M3R in the late 1980s and as many as 26 Su-24MR aircraft around 1990.
 114 BAP (114th Bomber Aviation Regiment) flying Sukhoi Su-24 aircraft; decommissioned around 1992.

The units at the base are now part of the 11th Air and Air Defence Forces Army of the Eastern Military District.

Four Su-30SM fighter aircraft from Domna were deployed to Khmeimim Air Base, Syria, on September 18, 2015.

Domna means "blast furnace" in Russian.

References

Further reading

External links
 Домна — аэродром, гарнизон, посёлок 

Soviet Air Force bases
Soviet Frontal Aviation
Russian Air Force bases